The 2014 DFB-Pokal Final decided the winner of the 2013–14 DFB-Pokal, the 71st season of Germany's premier football cup. It was played on 17 May at the Olympiastadion in Berlin.

In the final, Borussia Dortmund played Bayern Munich. The winners would have earned a place in the group stage of the 2014–15 UEFA Europa League, but both teams had already qualified for the 2014–15 UEFA Champions League via their league positions. Because of this, the three Europa League spots were passed down through league positions. This was the last season in which the cup runners-up would have qualified for the Europa League if the winners had already qualified for the Champions League. The winners also earned the right to play in the 2014 DFL-Supercup; as Bayern had already won the Bundesliga, Borussia Dortmund became their opponents regardless of the result due to them also finishing as league runners-up.	

It was Dortmund's sixth final, of which they had won three, including their most recent in 2012 against Bayern. Bayern were the defending champions, and it was their 20th final. 

Bayern Munich won a record 17th title, after defeating Dortmund 2–0 after extra time.

Route to the final
The DFB-Pokal began with 64 teams in a single-elimination knockout cup competition. There were a total of five rounds leading up to the final. Teams were drawn against each other, and the winner after 90 minutes would advance. If still tied, 30 minutes of extra time was played. If the score was still level, a penalty shoot-out was used to determine the winner.

Note: In all results below, the score of the finalist is given first (H: home; A: away).

Borussia Dortmund
Dortmund, of the Bundesliga, began their cup campaign on 3 August 2013, with a 3–0 away win over fourth-tier SV Wilhelmshaven, with three goals in the last 20 minutes from Kevin Großkreutz, Marvin Ducksch and Robert Lewandowski. In the second round, away to 1860 München at the Allianz Arena, the game was goalless after 90 minutes. Dortmund advanced with extra-time goals from Pierre-Emerick Aubameyang and Henrikh Mkhitaryan. In Round 3, away to 1. FC Saarbrücken of the 3. Liga, Dortmund won with goals from Julian Schieber and Jonas Hofmann. In the quarterfinals, Dortmund travelled to Eintracht Frankfurt, their first top-flight opponents of the campaign, winning by a late Aubameyang strike. Their semifinal was their only home game of the run, won 2–0 on 15 April 2014 against VfL Wolfsburg with goals from Mkhitaryan and Lewandowski.

Bayern Munich
Bayern Munich played their first-round match on 5 August 2013, away to fourth-tier BSV Schwarz-Weiß Rehden, Thomas Müller scoring a hat-trick in a 5–0 win with the other goals by Xherdan Shaqiri and Arjen Robben. In the second round, they faced fellow Bundesliga team Hannover 96 at home, winning 4–1 with a Müller double and goals by Claudio Pizarro and Franck Ribéry. Their third-round match was away to FC Augsburg, with Müller and Robben scoring to put Bayern into the quarterfinals. There they played Hamburger SV away, and won 5–0, with a Mario Mandžukić hat-trick as well as goals by Dante and Robben. Bayern played at home in the semifinal on 16 April, and beat 1. FC Kaiserslautern 5–1, with the goals shared between Bastian Schweinsteiger, Toni Kroos, Müller, Mandžukić and Mario Götze.

Pre-match
Bayern Munich were without Thiago due to a knee ligament injury that he received in March. The Saturday before the final, midfielder Bastian Schweinsteiger strained a tendon in his left knee against VfB Stuttgart, ruling him out. Bayern's top scorer of the season, Mario Mandžukić, was dropped from the team and did not travel to Berlin to the final. Manager Pep Guardiola said "Basti is injured, a problem with his knee. Mandzukic is my decision. He was fit, he could play but we have 18 players and I will play with them".

Borussia Dortmund striker Robert Lewandowski, who had agreed to join Bayern Munich at the end of the season, was excused from some training for the final as a precaution to injury. Manager Jürgen Klopp said "We were very careful with him".

Match

Details

References

External links
 
 Match report at kicker.de 
 Match report at WorldFootball.net
 Match report at Fussballdaten.de 

Borussia Dortmund matches
FC Bayern Munich matches
2013–14 in German football cups
2014
Football competitions in Berlin
May 2014 sports events in Europe
2014 in Berlin